Matilda of Vianden, Lady of Požega (born before 1220 - died after 1255) was daughter of Henry I, Count of Vianden (d. 1252) and Margaret of Courtenay (d. 1270), princess of the Latin Empire of Constantinople. Matilda′s father Henry was a prominent noble from the House of Vianden, while her mother Margaret was daughter of Peter Courtenay (d. 1219), Latin Emperor of Constantinople. Margaret′s brothers, consequent Latin emperors Robert (d. 1228) and Baldwin II (d. 1273), were Matilda′s maternal uncles.

Matilda was married (c. 1235) to John Angelos, Lord of Syrmia in the medieval Kingdom of Hungary. John was son of Byzantine Emperor Isaac II Angelos (d. 1204) and Princess Margaret of Hungary. John died before 1253, and Matilda became the Lady of Požega in medieval Požega County (central region in modern Slavonia). Their daughter Maria was married (c. 1253-1255) to Anselm de Cayeux, who later (before 1269) became camerlengo of the Latin Emperor Baldwin II of Constantinople, Maria′s great-uncle.

Various issues regarding the attribution of data related to two persons (father and son) who had the same name (Anselm de Cayeux), have been discussed in several genealogical studies, since sources from the 1280s and 1290s suggest that Matilda′s daughter Maria had a sister Helen, Queen of Serbia (d. 1314).

If those assumptions are correct, Matilda would be maternal grandmother of Serbian kings Stefan Dragutin and Stefan Milutin.

References

Sources

 
 
 
 
 
 
 
 
 
 

House of Vianden
Angelid dynasty
Medieval Hungarian nobility
History of Slavonia
Požega County
Požega, Croatia
1210s births
13th-century deaths
13th-century Hungarian women
13th-century Hungarian people